Bhangalan is a small village located in the Abohar Block of Fazilka district, Punjab, India. Bhangalan has two distinct regions, Bhangal Patti and Gill Patti (also known as Jhorar Patti and Jhorar Gill). The Gill families come from Gurusar (also known as Gurusar Ghagga) near Giddarbaha.

Demographics
According to the 2011 Indian Census, Bhangalan has a population of 2,451 people distributed throughout 478 households. The 2016 report showed that there were 1,268 men, 1,183 women, and 272 children aged 0–6 years. The village of Bhangalan has an average literacy rate of 63.52%, which is 12% below the average in the state of Punjab. The average male literacy rate is 71.98% and the average female literacy rate is 54.50%. Most Bhangalan villagers are subsistence farmers.

Bhangalan is in the Balluana constituency of the Punjab Legislative Assembly, represented by Nathu Ram of the Indian National Congress (INC), and the Firozpur constituency of the Parliament of India, represented by Sukhbir Singh Badal of the Shiromani Akali Dal (Supreme Akali Party; SAD), a Sikh-centric party.

Climate
January and May are the coldest and the warmest months, respectively. December is the driest month with only  of rainfall.

Development
Bhangalan is equipped with its own municipal water supply, reverse osmosis plant, and a Nestlé dairy. While Bhangalan has its own Government Middle School and Saint Farid Public School (Private), it lacks a high school, hospital, bank, and public playground. Many local political officials are working to help develop Bhangalan village.

Culture
The people of Bhangalan celebrate most Sikh festivals, including: Gurpurab, Maghi, Vaisakhi, Hola Mohalla, Bandi Chhor Divas, Lohri and Holi

Sports
The Youth Sports Welfare Club is a small club in Bhangalan village. Jajpreet Singh (Gosha) is president of club. Rassa kashi is a well-known sport in Bhangalan. Other popular sports include kabaddi, cricket, football, and volleyball.

References

Villages in Fazilka district